Scymninae is a subfamily of beetles in the family Coccinellidae. There are at least 170 described species in Scymninae.

Genera

 Acarinus Kapur, 1948
 Acoccidula Barowskij, 1931
 Andrzej Slipinski, 2007
 Aponephus Booth, 1991
 Apseudoscymnus Hoang, 1984
 Aspidimerus Mulsant, 1850
 Axinoscymnus Kamiya, 1963
 Blaisdelliana Gordon, 1970
 Brachiacantha Chevrolat in Dejean, 1837 (spurleg lady beetles)
 Calloeneis Grote, 1873
 Clitostethus Weise, 1885 (=Nephaspis)
 Crypticolus Strohecker, 1953
 Cryptognatha Mulsant, 1850
 Cryptogonus Mulsant, 1850
 Curticornis Gordon, 1971
 Cyra Mulsant, 1850
 Cyrema Blackburn, 1889
 Decadiomus Chapin, 1933
 Diazonema Weise, 1926
 Dichaina Weise, 1926
 Didion Casey, 1899
 Diomus Mulsant, 1850
 Erratodiomus Gordon, 1999
 Helesius Casey, 1899
 Heterodiomus Brèthes, 1924
 Hinda Mulsant, 1850
 Horniolus Weise, 1901
 Hyperaspidius Crotch, 1873
 Hyperaspis Chevrolat in Dejean, 1837
 Keiscymnus Sasaji, 1971
 Leptoscymnus Iablokoff-Khnzorian, 1978
 Magnodiomus Gordon, 1999
 Midus Mulsant, 1850
 Mimoscymnus Gordon, 1994
 Moiradiomus Vandenberg & Hanson, 2019
 Nephus Mulsant, 1846
 Parasidis Brèthes, 1924
 Pentilia Mulsant, 1850
 Planorbata Gordon, 1994
 Platynaspis Redtenbacher, 1843
 Propiptus Weise, 1901
 Pseudaspidimerus Kapur, 1948
 Pullosidis Fürsch, 1987
 Sasajiscymnus Vandenberg, 2004
 Scymniscus Dobzhanskiy, 1928
 Scymnobius Casey, 1899
 Scymnus Kugelann, 1794
 Selvadius Casey, 1899 (amber lady beetles)
 Stethorus Weise, 1885 (spider mite destroyers)
 Thalassa Mulsant, 1850
 Tiphysa Mulsant, 1850
 Veronicobius Broun, 1893
 Viridigloba Gordon, 1978
 Zagloba Casey, 1899 (scalehunter lady beetles)
 Zilus Mulsant, 1850 (velvethead lady beetles)

References

 "The Coccinellidae (Coleoptera) of America North of Mexico", Robert D. Gordon. 1985. Journal of the New York Entomological Society, Vol. 93, No. 1.
 Gordon, Robert D. (1985). "The Coccinellidae (Coleoptera) of America North of Mexico". Journal of the New York Entomological Society, vol. 93, no. 1, 1–912.
 Kuznetsov, Victor N. (1997). "Lady Beetles of the Russian Far East". Center for Systematic Entomology, Memoir No. 1, xii + 248.
 Lawrence, J. F., and A. F. Newton Jr. / Pakaluk, James, and Stanislaw Adam Slipinski, eds. (1995). "Families and subfamilies of Coleoptera (with selected genera, notes, references and data on family-group names)". Biology, Phylogeny, and Classification of Coleoptera: Papers Celebrating the 80th Birthday of Roy A. Crowson, vol. 2, 779–1006.
 Vandenberg, Natalia J. / Arnett, Ross H. Jr., M. C. Thomas, P. E. Skelley, and J. H. Frank, eds. (2002). "Family 93; Coccinellidae Latreille 1807". American Beetles, vol. 2; Polyphaga: Scarabaeoidea through Curculionoidea, 371–389.

Further reading

 NCBI Taxonomy Browser, Scymninae
 Arnett, R. H. Jr., M. C. Thomas, P. E. Skelley and J. H. Frank. (eds.). (21 June 2002). American Beetles, Volume II: Polyphaga: Scarabaeoidea through Curculionoidea. CRC Press LLC, Boca Raton, Florida .
 
 Richard E. White. (1983). Peterson Field Guides: Beetles. Houghton Mifflin Company.

Coccinellidae